Creixell is a municipality in the province of Tarragona, in the  autonomous community of Catalonia, Spain. It is a small town with 3,480 people residing within; mostly of an older demographic.

References

External links
 Government data pages 

Municipalities in Tarragonès
Populated places in Tarragonès